Edgewood Avenue is a street in Atlanta, Georgia, United States which runs from Five Points in Downtown Atlanta, eastward through the Old Fourth Ward. The avenue runs in the direction of the Edgewood neighborhood, and stops just short of it in Inman Park. Edgewood Avenue was first important as the route of a streetcar line to Inman Park, Atlanta's first garden suburb and home to many of its most prominent citizens. Today, the avenue is known for its restaurants and nightlife around its intersection with Boulevard.

History

Edgewood Avenue has its origins with the Atlanta & Edgewood Street Railroad Company, originally authorized to run horsecars along Foster Street to what was then the separate village of Edgewood. The company, owned by Joel Hurt, introduced Atlanta's first electric streetcar service in 1889. The streetcar was designed to make Hurt's garden suburb, Inman Park, easily and comfortably accessible.

At the time, on the present route of Edgewood Avenue, there existed two streets: Line Street, which ran from Peachtree Street east to Pryor Street, and Foster Street, which ran east from Calhoun (now Piedmont Avenue) due east towards the town of Edgewood. In between were 94 houses and lots. In order to provide a direct rout for the railway, Hurt's East Atlanta Land Company demolished the dwellings, built the missing road, and improved the entire avenue, rechristening it with its present name.

Restaurant and bar district
After decades of neglect, the part of the avenue located in the Old Fourth Ward has become a bar and restaurant district, home to a number of Atlanta's most eclectic nightspots. These include Sister Louisa's Church of the Living Room and Ping Pong Emporium a.k.a. simply Church, Corner Tavern, Noni's, Circa and the Sound Table, which was recognized as one of the 50 Best Bars in America by Food & Wine magazine. Bar and restaurant-owners are attracted to Edgewood's "non-corporate" feel, mostly due to its urban layout and historic buildings showcasing turn-of-the-century architecture. This all showing another period of growth and maturity for the corridor, since 2013 when Edgewood Avenue around Boulevard had been perceived by some as a site of "drug traffic, petty crime, and homeless hideaways".

, more eating and drinking establishments are opening, such as Bad Dog Taqueria, the Music Room, and Panbury's Double Crust Pies, as owners seek to capitalize on improved access to the area, particularly to tourists from downtown, via the Atlanta Streetcar, which will start service in late 2014.

In 2013, Creative Loafing editor Cliff Bostock called Edgewood Avenue "the most 'diverse' party and dining area in the city ... I'm talking age, sexual orientation, and lifestyle, as much as race." In April 2014, Atlanta magazine noted that the avenue had become "a foodie hangout", and only "recently". The article quoted Keiran Neely, co-owner of Pizzeria Vesuvius and the Music Room, as saying: "Edgewood Avenue has begun to explode based on the streetcar ... It seems like every week there’s a new restaurant or bar."

Transportation
Since late 2014 the Atlanta Streetcar has operated service along Edgewood Avenue eastbound from Park Place NE to Jackson St. NE, connecting the Centennial Olympic Park area in Downtown Atlanta to Sweet Auburn and the Martin Luther King, Jr., National Historic Site.

At each end, Edgewood Avenue is served by MARTA trains, at Five Points and Inman Park/Reynoldstown stations.

From 2013 to 2014, the Edgewood Avenue Bridge over the BeltLine trail was demolished and replaced, costing 4.5 million.

Route and Points of Interest
Source:

References

Roads in Atlanta
Old Fourth Ward
Restaurant districts and streets in the United States
Entertainment districts in the United States
Sweet Auburn